Rajko Grlić (born 2 September 1947) is a Croatian film director, producer and screenwriter. He is a professor of film theory at Ohio University and artistic director of the Motovun Film Festival in Motovun, Croatia.

Biography
Rajko Grlić was born in 1947 in Zagreb, SR Croatia, FPR Yugoslavia. His father was Danko Grlić, famous Croatian philosopher. Grlić's (Gerlich) family by father's side came to Zagreb from Schwarzwald, Germany in the 19th century, while his mother Eva (née Izrael) is from Jewish family of Sarajevo.

He graduated from the Film Faculty of the Academy of Performing Arts in Prague (FAMU) at the same time as Emir Kusturica, Serbian film director. During Croatian War of Independence Grlić moved to the USA.

In 2017, Grlić has signed the Declaration on the Common Language of the Croats, Serbs, Bosniaks and Montenegrins.

Filmography

As director
 Whichever Way the Ball Bounces (Kud puklo da puklo, 1974)
 Bravo Maestro (Bravo maestro, 1978)
 The Melody Haunts My Memory (Samo jednom se ljubi, 1981)
 In the Jaws of Life (U raljama života, 1984)
 Three for Happiness (Za sreću je potrebno troje, 1985)
 That Summer of White Roses (Đavolji raj, 1989)
 Charuga (Čaruga, 1991)
 Josephine (2002)
 The Border Post (Karaula, 2006)
 Just Between Us (Neka ostane među nama, 2010)
 The Constitution (Ustav Republike Hrvatske, 2016)

As producer
Whichever Way the Ball Bounces (Kud puklo da puklo, 1974)
In the Jaws of Life (U raljama života, 1984)
Three for Happiness (Za sreću je potrebno troje, 1985)
That Summer of White Roses (Đavolji raj, 1989)
Čaruga (1991)
Who Wants to be a President (2001)
Happy Kid (Sretno dijete) (2004)

See also 
 Praška filmska škola

References

External links
 Rajko Grlić's official website

Interview with Grlić

 
|-
! colspan="3" style="background: #DAA520;" | Pula Film Festival
|-

|-

|-
! colspan="3" style="background: #DAA520;" | Tokyo International Film Festival
|-

1947 births
Living people
Film people from Zagreb
Croatian atheists
Croatian people of Bosnia and Herzegovina-Jewish descent
Croatian people of Hungarian-Jewish descent
Croatian people of German-Jewish descent
Croatian film directors
Croatian screenwriters
Vladimir Nazor Award winners
Academy of Performing Arts in Prague alumni
Golden Arena for Best Director winners
Yugoslav film directors
Croatian male film actors
Croatian emigrants to the United States
Signatories of the Declaration on the Common Language
Golden Arena winners